The National Interagency Fire Center (NIFC) in Boise, Idaho is the physical facility which is the home to the National Interagency Coordination Center (NICC), and the National Multi-Agency Coordination group (NMAC or MAC).

The center works closely with, and is an arm of, the National Fire and Aviation Executive Board (NFAEB), which provides unified guidance for fire agencies in the U.S., and handbooks and guidelines to provide common procedures. It was created to implement the Federal Wildland Fire Management Act Policy. The NFAEB has created the Federal Fire Policy Directives Task Group, which coordinates with state agencies in order to implement cooperative agreements.

The center's primary mission is the complex interagency co-ordination of wildland firefighting resources in the U.S.  Although NIFC was initially founded to manage firefighting resources throughout the western states, the center is now designated as an "all-risk" co-ordination center, and as such provides support in response to other emergencies such as floods, hurricanes, and earthquakes for the United States at large; accordingly it also contributes to the national preparedness level.

History 
The National Interagency Fire Center began  in 1965 as the Boise Interagency Fire Center; its name was changed in 1993 to more accurately reflect its national mission.

Originally the U.S. Forest Service, Bureau of Land Management (BLM), and National Weather Service saw the need to work together to reduce service duplication, cut costs, and coordinate national fire planning and operations. The National Park Service and Bureau of Indian Affairs joined BIFC in the mid 1970s. The U.S. Fish and Wildlife Service joined in 1979.

The Wildland Firefighters National Monument was dedicated on May 25, 2000, and is on the grounds of the NIFC's headquarters

Escalation of fire coordination

Tier 3 - Local Control
Any wildland fire is perforce initially managed by the local agency which has the fire protection responsibility in its jurisdiction. Engines, ground crews, hotshots, smokejumpers, helicopters with water buckets, and airtankers may all be used for initial suppression. Various local agencies may work together, sharing personnel and equipment, to fight both new fires and those not contained by the initial response.

Tier 2 - Geographic Area Coordination Center(s)

The United States is divided into 11 geographic areas.  If a wildland fire grows to the point where local personnel and equipment are insufficient, the responsible agency contacts the Geographic Area Coordination Center (GACC) for help. The GACC will dispatch a Type 2 Incident Management Team (IMT) and they will locate and dispatch additional firefighters and support personnel throughout the geographic area at risk.

When the emergency exceeds the resources of the GACC, a call is then made to the National Interagency Coordination Center at the National Interagency Fire Center (NIFC).

Tier 1 - National Interagency Coordination Center
NIFC is the home of the National Interagency Coordination Center (NICC).  If a fire exceeds the level of local control and all the resources in its geographic area, NICC will dispatch a type 1 Incident Management Team and additional national resources from multiple agencies as required.

National Multi-Agency Coordination Group
The National Multi-Agency Coordination Group (NMAC or MAC) also resides at the NIFC; it is used to allocate and prioritize personnel and equipment if several simultaneous national emergencies are straining the support system.

MAC also establishes the National Preparedness Levels throughout the calendar year in order to help assure that firefighting resources are ready and able to respond to probable new incidents (a form of risk management). Preparedness Levels are dictated by burning conditions, fire activity, and (especially) resource availability.

Participating agencies
Several national and state assets are involved at NIFC:  
 U.S. Department of Agriculture and related...
 United States Forest Service (USFS)
 U.S. Department of Commerce
 U.S. National Weather Service (NWS)
 U.S. Department of Homeland Security and related...
 Federal Emergency Management Agency (FEMA)
 United States Fire Administration
 U.S. Department of the Interior, and related...
 Bureau of Indian Affairs (BIA)
 Bureau of Land Management (BLM)
 Fish and Wildlife Service (FWS)
 National Park Service (NPS)
 Office of Aircraft Services (OAS)

And the non-profit organization:
 National Association of State Foresters (NASF)

Location
The physical plant of the NIFC is located at the Boise Airport, east of the passenger terminal, at 3833 S. Developmental Avenue.

See also
Resource Ordering Status System
United States Fire Administration
USA.gov

References

External links

NATIONAL FIRE & AVIATION EXECUTIVE BOARD POLICY DIRECTIVES TASK GROUP
Basic organization of NFAEB

Wildfire suppression agencies
Wildfire prevention
Firefighting in Idaho

United States federal boards, commissions, and committees
Disaster preparedness in the United States
1965 establishments in Idaho